Phil Scott (born 17 January 1961) is a former Australian rules footballer who played for the West Coast Eagles in the Victorian/Australian Football League (VFL/AFL).

A foundation player at West Coast, Scott made his debut in the third round of the 1987 VFL season. He was used as a ruckman and represented Western Australia at the 1988 Adelaide Bicentennial Carnival. Scott twice won West Coast's 'Best Clubman' award, the second of which came after making his final appearance in the 1990 Preliminary Final loss to Essendon. He finished his career back at his original club, Subiaco, with whom he played in the 1986 premiership side. Having taken the field for two further years to bring his tally to 110 WAFL games, Scott retired.

References

Holmesby, Russell and Main, Jim (2007). The Encyclopedia of AFL Footballers. 7th ed. Melbourne: Bas Publishing.

1961 births
Living people
West Coast Eagles players
Subiaco Football Club players
Western Australian State of Origin players
Australian rules footballers from Western Australia